The NASCAR AutoZone Elite Division, Southeast Series was a NASCAR-sanctioned amateur/semi-pro late model stock car racing series based in the Southeastern United States. The series was formerly known as the Slim Jim All Pro Series; it was founded in 1991 as the result of a merger between the All PRO Super Series and the NASCAR All-American Challenge Series The drivers who have graduated from this series include Shawna Robinson, Rick Crawford, Robert Huffman, Jason Keller, and David Reutimann. NASCAR terminated the series, along with other AutoZone Elite Division series, following the 2006 season.

List of champions (NASCAR All Pro Series/Southeast Series)
The following drivers won the All Pro Series/Southeast Series championship between the series' inception in 1991 and its termination in 2006.

List of champions (NASCAR All-American Challenge Series)
The following drivers won the All-American Challenge Series championship between the series' inception in 1984 and its merger into the All-Pro Series termination in 1991.

List of champions (All PRO Super Series)
The following drivers won the All PRO Super Series championship between the series' inception in 1980 and its merger into the All-Pro Series termination in 1991.

References

External links 
Official website
NASCAR Southeast Series archive at Racing-Reference
NASCAR Southeast Series archive at The Third Turn

NASCAR series
Stock car racing series in the United States
Sports in the Southern United States